Wilhelm Jacob van Bebber (14 July 1841 – 1 September 1909) was a German meteorologist.

Bebber was born in Grieth near Kalkar. He was a member of the Academy of Sciences Leopoldina. Bebber died in Hamburg.

External links 

1841 births
1909 deaths
People from Kleve (district)
German meteorologists